James J. Kehoe (1863–January 26, 1909) was an American politician from New York.

Life
He was born in Brooklyn, and attended Public School No. 27. Then he became a teamster, and later a contractor. He married Margaret Devine (died 1930). Kehoe was a member of the New York State Assembly (Kings Co., 9th D.) in 1903 and 1904. He was a member of the New York State Senate (5th D.) in 1905 and 1906.

Kehoe died of pneumonia in his home at the age of 45.

References

Sources
Official New York from Cleveland to Hughes by Charles Elliott Fitch (Hurd Publishing Co., New York and Buffalo, 1911, Vol. IV; pg. 347f and 365)
The New York Red Book by Edgar L. Murlin (1903; pg. 146)

Democratic Party New York (state) state senators
People from Brooklyn
Democratic Party members of the New York State Assembly
1863 births
1909 deaths
19th-century American politicians